103 (CIII) was a common year starting on Sunday (link will display the full calendar) of the Julian calendar. At the time, it was known as the Year of the Consulship of Traianus and Maximus (or, less frequently, year 856 Ab urbe condita). The denomination 103 for this year has been used since the early medieval period, when the Anno Domini calendar era became the prevalent method in Europe for naming years.

Events

By place

Roman Empire 
 Emperor Trajan and Manius Laberius Maximus become Roman consuls.  
 Pliny the Younger becomes a member of the college of Augurs (103–104).
 Legio X Gemina moves to Vienna, where it remains until the 5th century.

By topic

Religion 
 In Palmyra, Syria, a Temple of the Sun is erected to the god Baal.

Births 
Kong Zhou, father of Kong Rong (d. 163)

Deaths 
 Kanishka I, ruler of the Kushan Empire (approximate date)
 Sextus Julius Frontinus, Roman author (b. c. AD 40)
 Silius Italicus, Roman politician and author (b. c. AD 28)
 Yin, Chinese empress of the Han Dynasty (b. AD 80)

References